Events from the year 1704 in the Kingdom of Scotland.

Incumbents 
 Monarch – Anne
 Secretary of State –
 until October: James Douglas, 2nd Duke of Queensberry, jointly with George Mackenzie, 1st Viscount Tarbat
 from October: John Ker, 5th Earl of Roxburghe jointly with James Ogilvy, 1st Earl of Seafield

Law officers 
 Lord Advocate – Sir James Stewart
 Solicitor General for Scotland – William Carmichael

Judiciary 
 Lord President of the Court of Session – Lord North Berwick
 Lord Justice General – Lord Tarbat
 Lord Justice Clerk – Lord Prestonhall, then Lord Whitelaw

Events 
 5 August – the Parliament of Scotland passes the Act of Security 1704 in response to the Parliament of England's Act of Settlement 1701, allowing the Scottish Parliament to select its own successor to the monarch.
 10 September – Lower Largo-born sailor Alexander Selkirk chooses to be marooned from a privateer ship in the Juan Fernández Islands.
 20 September – Dunkeld is erected a royal burgh.

Births 
 30 April – Jean Adam, poet (died 1765)
 7 September – John Hope, 2nd Earl of Hopetoun (died 1781)
Date unknown
 William Hamilton, Jacobite poet (died 1754)
 William Boyd, 4th Earl of Kilmarnock (died 1746)
 Thomas Lyon, 8th Earl of Strathmore and Kinghorne (died 1753)

Deaths 
 4 January – Sir Alexander Munro of Bearcrofts (year of birth unknown)
 6 March – George Seton, 4th Earl of Winton (born c. 1641)
 13 June – Arthur Rose, prelate (born 1634)
Date unknown
 Lilias Adie, accused witch (year of birth unknown)

See also 
 Timeline of Scottish history

References 

 
Years of the 18th century in Scotland
1700s in Scotland